A regional chair, referred to as the district chair in Muskoka District or the warden in Oxford County, is the head of council and chief executive officer of upper-tier municipalities (regional municipalities) in Ontario.

Chairs elected by councillors in most regional municipalities. Since 1997 in Waterloo Region, 2000 in Halton Region and 2014 in Durham Region, the chair is directly elected along with the rest of the council.

The position is similar to the role of the mayor or reeve in lower- or single-tier municipalities. In the former Metropolitan Toronto, now the amalgamated City of Toronto, the regional chair was called Metro Chairman.

References 

Local government in Ontario